Karpo Ačimović Godina (born 26 June 1943) is a Slovenian cinematographer and film director. He is one of the most important representatives of the Yugoslav cinematic movement "Black Wave", which produced numerous socio-critical films between 1964 and 1973. His film Artificial Paradise was screened out of competition at the 1990 Cannes Film Festival.

Selected filmography
 Occupation in 26 Pictures (1978)
 Artificial Paradise (1990)

References

Bibliography
 Filmkollektiv Frankfurt, ed. (2013). On the cinema of Karpo Godina or A book in 71383 words, 225 pages, .

External links

1943 births
Living people
Slovenian film directors
Slovenian cinematographers
Prešeren Award laureates
Golden Arena winners
Film people from Skopje